This is an incomplete list of Statutory Rules of Northern Ireland.

1922 to 1974
List of Statutory Rules and Orders of Northern Ireland

1991
List of Statutory Rules of Northern Ireland, 1991

1992
List of Statutory Rules of Northern Ireland, 1992

1993
List of Statutory Rules of Northern Ireland, 1993

1994
List of Statutory Rules of Northern Ireland, 1994

1995
List of Statutory Rules of Northern Ireland, 1995

1996
List of Statutory Rules of Northern Ireland, 1996

1997
List of Statutory Rules of Northern Ireland, 1997

1998
List of Statutory Rules of Northern Ireland, 1998

1999
List of Statutory Rules of Northern Ireland, 1999

2000
List of Statutory Rules of Northern Ireland, 2000

2001
List of Statutory Rules of Northern Ireland, 2001

2002
List of Statutory Rules of Northern Ireland, 2002

2003
List of Statutory Rules of Northern Ireland, 2003

2004
List of Statutory Rules of Northern Ireland, 2004

2005
List of Statutory Rules of Northern Ireland, 2005

2006
List of Statutory Rules of Northern Ireland, 2006

2007
List of Statutory Rules of Northern Ireland, 2007

2008
List of Statutory Rules of Northern Ireland, 2008

2009
List of Statutory Rules of Northern Ireland, 2009

2010
List of Statutory Rules of Northern Ireland, 2010

2011
List of Statutory Rules of Northern Ireland, 2011

2012
List of Statutory Rules of Northern Ireland, 2012

2013
List of Statutory Rules of Northern Ireland, 2013

2020
 List of Statutory Rules of Northern Ireland, 2020

2021
 List of Statutory Rules of Northern Ireland, 2021

2022
 List of Statutory Rules of Northern Ireland, 2022

2023
 List of Statutory Rules of Northern Ireland, 2023

Statutory Rules
 
Lists of lists